The 1948 World Table Tennis Championships men's doubles was the 15th edition of the men's doubles championship.
Bohumil Váňa and Ladislav Štípek won the title after defeating Adrian Haydon and Ferenc Soos in the final by three sets to nil.

Results

See also
List of World Table Tennis Championships medalists

References

-